The Neighborhood Reinvestment Corporation, doing business as NeighborWorks America, is a congressionally chartered nonprofit organization that supports community development in the United States and Puerto Rico. The organization provides grants and technical assistance to more than 240 community development organizations. NeighborWorks America provides training for housing and community development professionals through its national training institutes. Since 2007, NeighborWorks America has administered the Congressionally created National Foreclosure Mitigation Counseling Program.

The NeighborWorks network comprises more than 240 community development organizations working in urban, suburban and rural communities across the country.

The Neighborhood Reinvestment board of directors consists of the Deputy Secretary of Housing and Urban Development, a member of the Board of Governors of the Federal Reserve System, a member of the Chief Counsel Office of the Comptroller of the Currency, the Vice Chairman of the Federal Deposit Insurance Corporation and a member of the Board of the National Credit Union Administration.

History
Early origins of the nonprofit NeighborWorks® America are traced to 1968, when Dorothy Mae Richardson, a  Central North Side resident of Pittsburgh, started a campaign for better housing in her neighborhood. Dorothy Mae Richardson worked with city bankers and government officials to convince 16 financial institutions to give out conventional loans in the community.  Her legacy was an organization named the Neighborhood Housing Services (NHS) of Pittsburgh.  Eventually, Neighborhood Housing Services of Pittsburgh became the national model for community-based housing initiatives throughout the country.  In 1970, the Federal Home Loan Bank Board, became involved with Neighborhood Housing Services (NHS) of Pittsburgh, and started expanding the program by training savings and loan officers for urban areas nationally.

In 1978, Congress chartered Neighborhood Reinvestment Corporation, with a mission to recreate Neighborhood Housing Services of Pittsburgh's housing program throughout the nation's cities.

In 1984 the first Neighborhood Housing Week  (now called NeighborWorks Week) was congressionally established. President Ronald Reagan proclaimed a national observance.

During the 1980s the Ad Council worked with Neighborhood Reinvestment Corporation and created “NeighborWorks.”

Neighborhood Reinvestment Corporation began doing business as NeighborWorks America in 2005.

In 2007, Congress selected NeighborWorks America to administer the National Foreclosure Mitigation Counseling program. In a continuing effort to assist in recovery from the housing crisis, in 2009 NeighborWorks launched the Loan Modification Scam Alert campaign and Stable Communities Initiative. In June 2011, the U.S. Department of Housing and Urban Development in partnership with NeighborWorks America, launched the Emergency Homeowners' Loan Program to assist homeowners across the country at risk of foreclosure.

There are now more than 240 NeighborWorks organizations operating in urban, suburban and rural communities in all 50 states, the District of Columbia and Puerto Rico. In the past five years, NeighborWorks organizations have generated more than $19.5 billion in reinvestment in these communities. NeighborWorks America has become a leading trainer of community development, financial capability and affordable housing professionals. NeighborWorks America has helped more than 1.7 million homeowners through its congressionally funded National Foreclosure Mitigation Counseling program.

Community Leaders
In honor of its namesake, NeighborWorks America nationally offers the Dorothy Richardson Award for Resident Leadership.

Dorothy Richardson continued to live in Pittsburgh, Pennsylvania as an active community member and supervisor of the Pittsburgh Housing Clinic, until her death on April 28, 1991 at Allegheny General Hospital. She lived to 68.

She graduated from Allegheny High in 1940.

Leaders in NeighborWorks History
 Bill Whiteside, First Executive Director of Neighborhood Reinvestment Corporation from 1978 to 1990
George Knight, Executive Director from 1990 to 2000, Inducted into the Affordable Housing Hall of Fame
 Ellen Lazar, Executive Director from 2000 to 2003
 Kenneth Wade, CEO from 2004 to 2011
 Eileen Fitzgerald, CEO from 2011 to 2014
 Paul Weech, CEO from 2014 to 2017
Marietta Rodriguez, President and CEO from 2018 to present

See also
 Title 24 of the Code of Federal Regulations

Notes

External links

 Neighborhood Reinvestment Corporation in the Federal Register

Government-owned companies of the United States
Community development organizations
Local government in the United States
Non-profit organizations based in Washington, D.C.
1978 establishments in the United States
Affordable housing
Housing in the United States
Organizations established in 1978
Corporations chartered by the United States Congress